The Journal of Attention Disorders is a peer-reviewed academic journal covering the field of psychiatry and attention disorders. This journal is a member of the Committee on Publication Ethics (COPE). The journal's editor is Sam Goldstein (University of Utah). It has been in publication since 1996 and is currently published by SAGE Publications.

Abstracting and indexing 
The Journal of Attention Disorders is abstracted and indexed in, among other databases:  SCOPUS, and the Social Sciences Citation Index. According to the Journal Citation Reports, its 2017 impact factor is 3.668, ranking it 39 out of 142 journals in the category ‘Psychiatry’. and 12 out of 73 journals in the category ‘Psychology, Developmental’.

References

External links 
 

SAGE Publishing academic journals
English-language journals
Publications established in 1996
Attention disorders
Psychiatry journals
Journals published between 13 and 25 times per year